Volley is a 2014 Argentine comedy film written and directed by Martín Piroyansky. The cast is composed of Piroyansky, Violeta Urtizberea, Inés Efron, Chino Darín, Vera Spinetta and Justina Bustos.

Plot
Nicolás (Martín Piroyansky), Pilar (Inés Efron), Catalina (Vera Spinetta), Manuela (Violeta Urtizberea) and Nacho (Chino Darín) are friends since they were teenagers. Around their thirties they are still united, although with more differences than meeting points. Nico proposes to celebrate New Year's night at the Tigre family home and spend a few days on vacation. Without consulting, Manuela invites Belén (Justina Bustos), her childhood friend.

Cast
 Martín Piroyansky as Nicolás
 Violeta Urtizberea as Manuela
 Inés Efron as Pilar
 Chino Darín as Ignacio "Nacho"
 Justina Bustos as Belén
 Vera Spinetta as Catalina

References

External links 
 

2014 films
2014 comedy films
Argentine comedy films
2010s Argentine films